Flamingoes in Orbit is a collection of short stories by Philip Ridley. It was first published in the United Kingdom by Hamish Hamilton ltd in 1990. It was Ridley's third literary work for adults after his 1988 novella Crocodilia and his 1989 novel In The Eyes of Mr Fury.

In 2015 publisher Valancourt Books announced plans to republish Flamingoes in Orbit, along with Ridley's previously published gay themed literature for adults. This new edition of the book was released on 26 June 2018.

Both versions of the book are significantly different, with many of the stories being rewritten and some renamed in the 2018 edition. The newer version of the book also adds two new stories to the collection but omits five stories from the first edition.

Stories

First edition
The first edition of the book is composed of thirteen short stories, with the title story first:

Flamingoes in Orbit
The Turbulence of Butterfly Wings 
Embracing Verdi
Pins
Towers of Belief
What We Care to Remember
The Fear of Hyacinths
A Shoe Three Inches Big
Leviathan
What's Here
Rattlesnake
Go
The Barbaric Continuity

Fully revised edition (2018)

The 2018 edition of the book is composed of ten short stories:

The Tooth of Troy Flamingo (Originally named Flamingoes in Orbit in the first edition)
Pins
A Shoe Three Inches Big
The Fear of Hyacinths
Embracing Verdi
Alien Heart
Towers of Belief
Leviathan
Another Story (Highly reworked version of The Barbaric Continuity from the first edition)
Wonderful Insect

Previously published stories
Before the publication of the first edition of the collection two of Ridley's stories had already appeared in other anthologies. Embracing Verdi had appeared in the collection Oranges and lemons: stories by gay men (edited by David Rees and Peter Robbins) in 1987 and Leviathan was featured in the collection 20 Under 35: Original Stories by Britain's Best New Young Writers (edited by Peter Straus) in 1988.

For the 2018 edition two further stories were added to the collection that had been previously published. Alien Heart had been included in Projections 4½ (edited by John Boorman and Walter Donohue) in 1995. Wonderful Insect has been reported to have been previously published elsewhere and a significant part of the story is featured in Ridley's semi-autobiographical prose Introduction of his second collection of plays for adults Philip Ridley Plays: 2 which was published in 2009.

References

Hamish Hamilton books
1990 short story collections
British short story collections
LGBT short story collections
Novels by Philip Ridley